Harry's Filters is a plugin for Adobe Photoshop, which includes a set of 69 different image effects. There are 9 main effect categories including, among others, warp, pattern or color effects. Each main category then contains a series of parameters to fine-tune the effect.

The plugin also features a "jump" button, which selects a random effect and applies it to the picture. It serves mainly to quickly experiment with the various effects. Each effect configuration can be saved and reused later on.

References

Adobe Photoshop